Ercheia ekeikei is a species of moth of the family Erebidae. It is found in New Guinea as well as Queensland.

The wingspan is about 10 mm.

References

External links
Australian Caterpillars

Moths described in 1906
Ercheiini